Air Excellence was an airline based in Libreville, Gabon. It was established in 2002 and ceased operations in 2004.

Fleet 
As of August 2006 the Air Excellence fleet included:

1 Antonov An-28
 Beech Baron
 Hawker Siddeley HS 748

References 

Defunct airlines of Gabon
Airlines established in 2002
Airlines disestablished in 2004
Companies based in Libreville
Gabonese companies established in 2002